Michael Neary may refer to:

 Michael Neary (Rhode Island Democratic Politician) (born 1993), Candidate For U.S. House of Representatives in Rhode Island's 2nd congressional district
 Michael Neary (surgeon), Irish consultant obstetrician/gynecologist
 Michael Neary (bishop) (born 1946), Roman Catholic Archbishop of Tuam, Ireland
 Mike Neary (born 1948), Canadian rower